The women's 3000 metres event at the 1993 Summer Universiade was held at the UB Stadium in Buffalo, United States on 17 July 1993. This was the last time this event was held at the Games, being replaced with the 5000 metres at the 1995 edition.

Results

References

Athletics at the 1993 Summer Universiade
1993 in women's athletics
1993